AS5678 is a requirements specification created by SAE International for the production and test of passive only Radio Frequency Identification (RFID) tags for the Aerospace industry.  This specification is also related to the Air Transportation Association SPEC2000 specification.  

RFID tags are small devices that are used by a variety of industries in a variety of applications for the tracking of products, materials, assets and personnel.  They vary in their ruggedness and durability from throwaway retail applications (retail compliance items such as Wal-Mart, Metro, and other retailers specifying shipping carton labeling) to high durability tagging for items such as aircraft parts (SPEC2000 requirements for Boeing, Airbus and others tracking aircraft parts) that must withstand aerospace environments over their lifetimes.

See also
Air Transport Association

References 

Spec 2000

Radio-frequency identification